Vauxhall is an unincorporated community located within Union Township in Union County, New Jersey, United States. Vauxhall borders Millburn, Maplewood and Springfield. The area is served as United States Postal Service ZIP Code 07088.

As of the 2010 United States Census, the population for ZIP Code Tabulation Area 07088 was 3,606.

Demographics

Notable people

People who were born in, residents of, or otherwise closely associated with Vauxhall include:
 Nija Charles (born 1997), singer-songwriter and record producer.
 Amalya Lyle Kearse (born 1937), a judge of the United States Court of Appeals for the Second Circuit.
 Myra Smith Kearse (1899–1982), physician and community leader.
 Elliott Maddox (born 1947), former professional baseball player who played for both the New York Mets and New York Yankees.
 Lawrence E. Roberts (1922–2004), pilot with the Tuskegee Airmen and a colonel in the United States Air Force.

References

External links
Census 2000 Fact Sheet for Zip Code Tabulation Area 07088 from the United States Census Bureau

Union Township, Union County, New Jersey
Unincorporated communities in Union County, New Jersey
Unincorporated communities in New Jersey